Moulsey Hurst is in West Molesey, Surrey on the south bank of the River Thames above Molesey Lock. It is one of England's oldest sporting venues and was used in the 18th and 19th centuries for cricket, prizefighting and other sports. This area is now called Hurst Park; the area currently called Molesey Hurst is smaller, and some 500m to the south.

The site can be reached from Hampton across the river by Hampton Ferry when it is running in the summer.

Sporting venue
When James VI and I became King of England in 1603, he introduced the sport of golf to the country. The first games of golf in England were played at Molesey, in Westminster and Greenwich Park which were large open spaces near to royal palaces.

This venue is considered to be one of the oldest used for organised cricket. The earliest known use of the site for the game was in 1723 for a match between a Surrey side and London. One of cricket's most famous paintings is Cricket at Moulsey Hurst, by Richard Wilson in 1780. The painting is owned by MCC and on display at Lord's.

It hosted for some decades Hurst Park horse race course, evinced by an 1872 Ordnance Survey map. The cricket ground probably remained in the centre of the racecourse, which was common practice in the 18th century.

Molesey Hurst Golf Club (now defunct) was founded in 1907. The club disappeared at the onset of WW2.

Other sports and activities included ballooning, sprinting and archery.

Moulsey Hurst today
In 2004, Hurst Park Residents Association laid out a "heritage marker" close to the river, which contains a number of illustrations of the history and activities of the area.

Chronology of events
 871 – Vikings sailed up the Thames here to sack Chertsey Abbey
 1723 – the earliest known use of the site for cricket: Surrey v. London
 1733 – earliest known use of the site for an inter-county match when Surrey played Middlesex
 May 1785 – James Sadler made a hot air balloon ascent near here, accompanied by a member of parliament, about a year after the success of the Montgolfier Brothers balloon
 Autumn 1787 – a professional runner named Powell ran a mile in 4 minutes and 3 seconds at Moulsey Hurst in preparation for an attempt on the 4-minute mile
 August 1795 – in a cricket match at Moulsey Hurst, John Tufton was dismissed leg before wicket by John Wells, the first time the mode of dismissal is recorded.
 1798 – a Mr Troward, a member of the Toxophilite Society, shot an arrow on a level piece of ground on Moulsey Hurst seventeen score, or 340 yards
 1806 – last known use of Moulsey Hurst for a first-class cricket match was a Surrey v England match.

References

1726 establishments in Great Britain
Boxing venues in the United Kingdom
Cricket grounds in Surrey
Defunct cricket grounds in England
Defunct sports venues in Surrey
Borough of Elmbridge
English cricket venues in the 18th century
History of Surrey
Parks and open spaces in Surrey
Sport in Surrey
Sports venues completed in 1726